Sinivali is a Vedic goddess, mentioned in two hymns of the Rigveda, in RV 2.32 and RV 10.184. In 2.32.7-8 she is described as broadhipped, fair-armed, fair-fingered, presiding over fecundity and easy birth. She is invoked together with  Ganga, Raaka, Sarasvati, Indrani and Varunani. In 10.184.2, she is invoked together with Sarasvati to place the fetus in the womb.

In later Vedic texts, she is identified with Raka, presiding over the new moon.

Sinivali is also the name of a daughter of Angiras in the Mahabharata, of a wife of Dhatr and of the mother of Darsha in the Brahma Purana, and a name of Durga.

References

Rigvedic deities
Fertility goddesses
Hindu goddesses